Åsa is a locality situated in Kungsbacka Municipality, Halland County, Sweden, with 3,369 inhabitants in 2010. It may be the  inspiration for the song One Rode to Asa Bay by the Swedish black metal and Viking metal band Bathory.

Sports
The following sports clubs are located in Åsa:

 Åsa IF

References 

Populated places in Kungsbacka Municipality
Coastal cities and towns in Sweden